Castro brothers may refer to:

Fidel Castro and Raúl Castro, Cuban Communist leaders and revolutionaries
Ramón Castro Ruz, the lesser-known older brother to Fidel and Raúl

Joaquin Castro and Julian Castro, U.S. Democratic politicians from San Antonio who are identical twins
Cleveland kidnapper Ariel Castro and his brothers

See also
Castro (surname)